Salt Spring Island or Saltspring Island is one of the Gulf Islands in the Strait of Georgia between mainland British Columbia, Canada, and Vancouver Island.

The island was initially inhabited by various Salishan peoples before being settled by immigrant pioneers in 1859, at which time it was renamed Admiral Island. It was the first of the Gulf Islands to be settled and the first agricultural settlement on the islands in the Colony of Vancouver Island, as well as the first island in the region to permit settlers to acquire land through pre-emption. The island was retitled to its current name in 1910. It is named for the salt springs found in the northern part of the island.

Salt Spring Island is the largest, most populous, and the most frequently visited of the Southern Gulf Islands.

History
Salt Spring Island, or ĆUÁN (čuʔén), was initially inhabited by Salishan peoples of various tribes. Other Saanich placenames on the island include: ȾESNO¸EṈ¸ (t̕ᶿəsnáʔəŋ̕) for Beaver Point, S¸ĆUÁN (sʔčuʔén) for Cape Keppel, W̱ENÁ¸NEĆ (xʷən̕en̕əč) for Fulford Harbour, SYOW̱T (syaxʷt) for Ganges Harbour, and ṮÁȽEṈ (ƛ̕éɬəŋ) for Isabella Point.

The island became a refuge from racism for African Americans who had resided in California. They left California in 1858 after the state passed discriminatory legislation against blacks. Several of the families settled on this island including families of George Richardson and William Isaacs who occupied land behind the village of Shiya'hwt; others on Vancouver Island. Before the emigration, Mifflin Wistar Gibbs travelled with two other men up to the colony to interview Governor James Douglas about what kind of treatment they could expect there. The Governor was a Guyanese man of multi-ethnic birth, and assured them that people of African descent in Canada would be fairly treated and that the colony had abolished slavery more than 20 years before. Nevertheless the natives opposed the black settlers' presence.

The island was the first of the Gulf Islands to be settled by non-First Nations people. According to 1988's A Victorian Missionary and Canadian Indian Policy, it was the first agricultural settlement established anywhere in the Colony of Vancouver Island that was not owned by the Hudson's Bay Company or its subsidiary the Pugets Sound Agricultural Company.

Salt Spring Island was the first in the Colony of Vancouver Island and British Columbia to allow settlers to acquire land through pre-emption: settlers could occupy and improve the land before purchase, being permitted to buy it at a cost per acre of one dollar after proving they had done so. Before 1871 (when the merged Colony of British Columbia joined Canada), all property acquired on Salt Spring Island was purchased in this way; between 1871 and 1881, it was still by far the primary method of land acquisition, accounting for 96% of purchases.  As a result, the history of early settlers on Salt Spring Island is unusually detailed.

Demographically, early settlers of the island included not only African Americans, but also Native Hawaiians, First Nation peoples, and British Isles settlers, including English, Irish, and Scots. The method of land purchase helped to ensure that the land was used for agricultural purposes and that the settlers were mostly families. Ruth Wells Sandwell in Beyond the City Limit indicates that few of the island's early residents were commercial farmers, with most families maintaining subsistence plots and supplementing through other activities, including fishing, logging, and working for the colony's government. Some families later abandoned their land as a result of lack of civic services on the island or other factors, such as the livestock-killing cold of the winter of 1862.

During World War II, 77 Japanese Canadians living on Salt Spring Island were forcibly relocated away from the coast due to the Internment of Japanese Canadians. Gavin C. Mouat was appointed Custodian of the properties they left behind. Mouat sold the properties below market value using his Custodial rights without the consent of the owners. Salt Spring Lands Ltd., of which Mouat was the president, ended up purchasing some of the properties. Only one of the interned families, the Murakami's, purchased property on the island again and returned.

During the 1960s, the island became a political refuge for United States citizens, this time for draft evaders during the Vietnam War.

Etymology
The island was known as "Chuan" or "Chouan" Island in 1854, but it was also called "Salt Spring" as early as 1855, because of the island's salt springs. In 1859, it was officially named "Admiralty Island" in honour of Rear-Admiral Robert Lambert Baynes by surveyor Captain Richards, who named various points of the island in honour of the Rear-Admiral and his flagship, HMS Ganges. Even while named "Admiralty Island", it was referred to popularly as Salt Spring, as in James Richardson's report for the Geological Survey of Canada in 1872. According to records of the Geographic Board of Canada, the island was officially retitled Saltspring on March 1, 1910, though the year 1905 is given by unofficial sources. According to the Integrated Land Management Bureau of British Columbia, locals incline equally to Salt Spring and Saltspring for current use. The official chamber of commerce website for the island, which gives a date of 1906 for the renaming, adopts the two word title, stating that the Geographic Board of Canada, in choosing the one word name, "cared nothing for local opinion or Island tradition."

Geography and locale
Located between Mainland British Columbia and Vancouver Island, Salt Spring Island is the most frequently visited of the Gulf Islands as well as the most populous, with a 2016 census population of 10,557 inhabitants. The largest village on the island is Ganges. The island is known for its artists. In addition to Canadian dollars, island banks and some island businesses accept Salt Spring's own local currency, the Salt Spring dollar.

The island is part of the Southern Gulf Islands, (Salt Spring Island, Galiano Island, Pender Island, Saturna Island, Mayne Island), which are all part of the Capital Regional District, along with the municipalities of Greater Victoria.

Climate
Salt Spring Island has a temperate warm-summer mediterranean climate (Csb) and experiences warm, dry summers and cool winters.

Hiking trails 
Salt Spring Island has many hiking trails. These two mountain peaks are the tallest points of land on the Southern Gulf Islands. Many short hikes can also be found on the island.

Notable residents

Michael Ableman – author, organic farmer
Don Arney - inventor
Randy Bachman – musician, songwriter, and CBC personality) (moved off island) 
Nick Bantock – author and artist (former resident of Salt Spring Island)
Robert Bateman – wildlife artist
Arthur Black – CBC personality and humorist (deceased) 
Brian Brett – poet and novelist (moved away)
Howard Busgang – comedian and television producer
Michael Colgan – nutritionist/bodybuilding writer
Jane Eaton Hamilton ("Hamilton") - novelist, poet, short story writer, essayist (1986-1991; 2017-)
Bill Henderson – singer-songwriter (The Collectors, Chilliwack)
Robert Hilles – poet and novelist
Tom Hooper – singer, songwriter, co-founder of the Grapes of Wrath
Chris Humphreys – British actor, playwright and novelist
Dan Jason – author, organic farming advocate
Mary Kitagawa - educator 
Sky Lee – artist and novelist
Peter Levitt – poet and translator
Pearl Luke – author
Derek Lundy – author
Tara MacLean – musician and singer-songwriter
Harry Manx – musician and singer-songwriter
Stuart Margolin – actor and director (The Rockford Files—former resident of Salt Spring Island)
James Monger – PhD award-winning geologist
Malcolm Muggeridge - English journalist, author, soldier, spy, Christian apologist, iconoclast (briefly)
Kathy Page – writer
Kevin Patterson – medical doctor and writer
Briony Penn – University of Victoria professor, author, and environmental activist
Jan Rabson – voice-over actor
Raffi – singer-songwriter 
Bruce Reid - local businessman
Eric Roberts - British intelligence officer
Clare Rustad – Canada women's national soccer team
Hannah Simone – actor, producer, writer (New Girl)
Malcolm Smith – motorcyclist
Sylvia Stark – African-American pioneer
Patrick Taylor – Northern Irish author
Meg Tilly – actress and novelist
Valdy – folk and country musician
Phyllis Webb – poet and radio broadcaster
Simon Whitfield – Olympic triathlon champion
Ronald Wright – author
Olivia Poole - inventor

Education

 Gulf Islands Secondary School
 Salt Spring Island Middle School
 Fulford Elementary School
 Salt Spring Elementary School
 Salt Spring Centre School
 Phoenix School
 Fernwood Elementary School

Transportation
Local bus transit on the island is provided by BC Transit.

BC Ferries operates three routes to Salt Spring: between Tsawwassen (on the BC mainland) and Long Harbour (on the east side of Salt Spring), between Swartz Bay (at the north end of Vancouver Island's Saanich Peninsula) and Fulford Harbour (at the south end of Salt Spring), and between Crofton (on the east side of Vancouver Island) and Vesuvius (on the west side of Salt Spring).

Salt Spring Air, Seair Seaplanes and Harbour Air Seaplanes operate floatplane services from Ganges Water Aerodrome to Vancouver Harbour Water Airport and Vancouver International Water Airport. Kenmore Air operates between Ganges and Lake Union, Seattle, United States.

Salt Spring Island Library 
Library facilities have existed on Salt Spring in one form or another since the early 1930s. The demand for books and resources has only grown since then, requiring constant expansions over the years to accommodate the needs of the island residents. In December 2012, the new Salt Spring Island Public Library was opened. The library is staffed by three librarians, among other paid positions and close to 200 volunteers.

Communications
Telecommunications service providers include Telus and Shaw, with most wireless carriers providing coverage.  The Island is served by the Ganges and Fulford Harbour exchanges.
Active Radio Amateurs maintain wireless repeaters located on Mt Bruce. 2 meter band (147.320 MHz). Coverage from Nanaimo, Vancouver and Victoria.

See also
Long Harbour, British Columbia
 Ruckle Provincial Park
 Wallace Island Marine Provincial Park
 Salt Spring dollar

References

External links

 Islands Trust, Salt Spring Island
Salt Spring Island Archives

 
Islands of the Gulf Islands
Black Canadian settlements
Populated places in the Capital Regional District
History of Black people in British Columbia